The 2013 Ulster Senior Football Championship was the 125th installment of the annual Ulster Senior Football Championship held under the auspices of the Ulster GAA. Donegal were the defending Ulster and All-Ireland champions and were aiming for their third consecutive provincial title.

The final of the competition was contested by two teams from south of the border for the first time since 1983. This was confirmed when Donegal defeated Down in the first semi-final, with the second semi-final between Monaghan and Cavan still to play. Monaghan won that semi-final and went on to win their first Ulster title in 25 years when they overcame Donegal on a scoreline of 0-13 to 0-7 in Clones. They had previously lost finals in 2007 and 2010. They received the Anglo-Celt Cup, and automatically advanced to the quarter-final stage of the 2013 All-Ireland Senior Football Championship.

Bracket

Preliminary round

Quarter-finals

Semi-finals

Final

References

External links
Ulster GAA website

2U
Gaelic
Ulster Senior Football Championship